Hà Đình Đức is a Vietnamese biologist. He was born on March 23, 1940, in the Thọ Xuân District  of Thanh Hóa Province, Vietnam. He is known for describing the Hoan Kiem turtle, which he classified under name Rafetus leloii. Duc believes it is distinct from the Yangtze giant softshell turtle, which is generally regarded by other biologists as the same species. He has also been at odds with other conservationists and officials who believe the turtle should remain in the Hoan Kiem lake, while he believes it should be removed to avoid competing with other invasive turtle species of the lake. Additionally, Ha believes there is only one Hoan Kiem turtle living in the lake, even though witnesses have reported at least one other turtle in the lake.

References

External links 
 Professor Ha Dinh Duc's website

1940 births
Living people
Vietnamese biologists